Michail Travlos was born in 1950 in Piraeus, Greece. He started his musical studies at Athens National Conservatory in 1970 with  Michalis Vourtsis. In 1975, he was accepted to the Hochschule das Künste Berlin, where he studied composition with  Isang Yun until 1980, when he obtained his diploma in Music Composition. 
He lives in Piraeus as an independent composer and professor of theory and composition. He taught at the Hellenic Conservatory (1980-1982), the Contemporary Conservatory (1987-1996) and at the "Nikos Skalkotas" Conservatory (1982-2014) where he was also the artistic director (1989-2014).
From 2015 he teaches music theory and composition at the Conservatory of Modern Art in Anavissos.

Work
He has written music for large and small ensembles, for solo instruments,   as well as chamber opera and concertos for solo instruments and orchestra. His works have been performed in many countries such as Canada, USA, Germany, France, Italy, Russia, Poland, Spain, England, the Netherlands. 
His works were chosen twice by Gaudeamus Foundation to be performed in the     International Gaudeamus Music Week in the Netherlands, in 1978 the work Seven Happenings for 8 players (1977) and in 1984 Motivic Variations for solo cello (1983), respectively. In 1985 the International Society of Contemporary Music, ISCM included his award-winning orchestral work Prisma (1979-1980) for the International Music Days.

His music is published by Ch. Nakas – C. Papagrigoriou Co. in Greece and TONOS- Musikverlage in Germany.

The works of Michail Travlos have been recorded extensively and appear on a dozen CDs available on the European and US labels such as Ablaze, Lyra, Tar, Dna, El Culto/ClassXX and others.

Awards
 1st Prize: International Composers' Competition, Jeunesses Musicales International (JMI) in Belgrade, for his work         Eniwetock (1979).
 1st Prize: International Composers' Competition, in Stuttgart, for his string quartet Metathesis (1979).
 Prince Pierre of Monaco Music Composition Award (Prince Pierre Foundation), for his orchestral work Πρίσμα (Prisma)(1981).
 Prize: Competition of Hellenic Ministry of Culture, for his orchestral work Πρίσμα (Prisma) (1982).
 Prize: Competition of Hellenic Ministry of Culture, for his string quartet Metathesis (1979).
 Prize: Competition of the Municipality of Athens, for his work Adventures of Ulysses (Adventures of Ulysses) (1991).

External links
 Michail Travlos
Composers - Michalis Travlos

1950 births
20th-century classical composers
21st-century classical composers
Experimental composers
Greek classical composers
Living people
Musicians from Piraeus
Male classical composers
20th-century male musicians
21st-century male musicians